Gomphocerinae, sometimes called "slant-faced grasshoppers", are a subfamily of grasshoppers found on every continent but Antarctica and Australia.

Tribes and genera
Tribes and genera include:

Arcypterini

Auth.: Bolívar, 1914 - Africa, Palearctic, mainland Asia
Adolfius Harz, 1988
Amplicubitoacris Zheng, 2010
Arcyptera Serville, 1838
Asulconotoides Liu, 1984
Asulconotus Ying, 1974
Aulacobothrus Bolívar, 1902
Berengueria Bolívar, 1909
Brachypteracris Cao & Zheng, 1996
Crucinotacris Jago, 1996
Kangacris Yin, 1983
Kangacrisoides Wang, Zheng & Niu, 2006
Leionotacris Jago, 1996
Leuconemacris Zheng, 1988
Ningxiacris Zheng & He, 1997
Pseudoarcyptera Bolívar, 1909
Ptygonotus Tarbinsky, 1927
Rhaphotittha Karsch, 1896
Suacris Yin, Zhang & Li, 2002
Transtympanacris Lian & Zheng, 1985
Xinjiangacris Zheng, 1993

Other tribes A

Acrolophitini Scudder, 1901 - Nearctic
Acrolophitus Thomas, 1871
Bootettix Bruner, 1889
Amblytropidiini Brunner von Wattenwyl, 1893 - Americas
 Genus group Peruviae Cadena-Castañeda & Cardona, 2015
 Apolobama Bruner, 1913
 Peruvia Scudder, 1890
Amblytropidia Stål, 1873
Boopedon Thomas, 1870
Caribacris Rehn & Hebard, 1938
Fenestra Brunner von Wattenwyl, 1895
Pseudoutanacris Jago, 1971
Sinipta Stål, 1861
Syrbula Stål, 1873
Aulocarini Contreras & Chapco, 2006 - Nearctic
Ageneotettix McNeill, 1897
Aulocara Scudder, 1876
Eupnigodes McNeill, 1897
Horesidotes Scudder, 1899
Psoloessa Scudder, 1875

Tribes C

Chrysochraontini Brunner von Wattenwyl, 1893 - Nearctic, Palaerctic
Barracris Gurney, Strohecker & Helfer, 1964
Chloealtis Harris, 1841
Chrysochraon Fischer, 1853
Confusacris Yin & Li, 1987
Euchorthippus Tarbinsky, 1926
Euthystira Fieber, 1852
Euthystiroides Zhang, Zheng & Ren, 1995
Mongolotettix Rehn, 1928
Podismomorpha Lian & Zheng, 1984
Podismopsis Zubovski, 1900
Pseudoasonus Yin, 1982
Cibolacrini Otte, 1981 - Nearctic
Cibolacris Hebard, 1937
Heliaula Caudell, 1916
Ligurotettix McNeill, 1897
Xeracris Caudell, 1916
Compsacrini Carbonell, 1995 - Americas
Chiapacris Otte, 1979
Compsacris Bolívar, 1890
Notopomala Jago, 1971
Phaneroturis Bruner, 1904
Silvitettix Bruner, 1904
Staurorhectus Giglio-Tos, 1897

Dociostaurini

Auth. Mistshenko, 1974; distribution: Africa, mainland Europe and Asia
Albistriacris Zheng & Lu, 2002
Dociostaurus Fieber, 1853
Eremippus Uvarov, 1926
Eremitusacris Liu, 1981
Leva Bolívar, 1909
Mizonocara Uvarov, 1912
Notostaurus Bey-Bienko, 1933
Xerohippus Uvarov, 1942

Eritettigini

Auth. Otte, 1981: Nearctic
Amphitornus McNeill, 1897
Compsacrella - monotypic C. poecila Rehn & Hebard, 1938
Eritettix Bruner, 1889
Opeia McNeill, 1897

Gomphocerini

[[File:Glyptobothrus brunneus.JPG|thumb|right|Chorthippus (Glyptobothrus) sp.]]

Auth. Fieber, 1853; widespread - selected genera
 Aeropedellus Hebard, 1935
 Bruneria McNeill, 1897
 Chorthippus Fieber, 1852
 Gomphoceridius Bolívar, 1914
 Gomphocerippus Roberts, 1941
 Gomphocerus Thunberg, 1815
 Myrmeleotettix Bolívar, 1914
 Pseudochorthippus Defaut, 2012

Hypernephiini
Auth. Mistshenko, 1973; distribution central AsiaAnaptygus Mistshenko, 1951Asonus Yin, 1982Caucasippus Uvarov, 1927Dysanema Uvarov, 1925Eclipophleps Tarbinsky, 1927Grigorija Mistshenko, 1976Hebetacris Liu, 1981Hypernephia Uvarov, 1922Oknosacris Liu, 1981Oreoptygonotus Tarbinsky, 1927Ptygippus Mistshenko, 1951Saxetophilus Umnov, 1930Stristernum Liu, 1981

Tribes M
Melanotettigini Otte, 1981 monotypic tribe and genus - North AmericaMelanotettix: Melanotettix dibelonius Bruner, 1904
Mermiriini

Auth. Brunner von Wattenwyl, 1893 - North AmericaAchurum Saussure, 1861Mermiria Stål, 1873Pseudopomala Morse, 1896

Ochrilidiini
Auth. Brunner von Wattenwyl, 1893; distribution: Africa, southern Europe, Asia through to West Malesia and Japan.Gonista Bolívar, 1898Kirmania Uvarov, 1933Ochrilidia Stål, 1873Oxypterna Ramme, 1952

Tribes O

Orinhippini Yin, Xia et al., (monotypic) central AsiaOrinhippus Uvarov, 1921
Orphulellini Otte, 1979 - AmericasDichromorpha Morse, 1896Laplatacris Rehn, 1939Orphulella Giglio-Tos, 1894Orphulina Giglio-Tos, 1894

Tribe and genus group P
 Pacrini Zhang, Zhang & Yin, 2012 [temporary name]
 Pacris Zhang, Zhang & Yin, 2012Paropomala genus group
 Cordillacris Rehn, 1901
 Paropomala Scudder, 1899
 Prorocorypha Rehn, 1911

Ramburiellini

Auth.: Defaut, 2012 - monotypic tribe: Africa, Europe, and AsiaRamburiella Bolívar, 1906

Scyllinini
Auth.: Brunner von Wattenwyl, 1893 - Central and South AmericaAlota Bruner, 1913Borellia Rehn, 1906Carrascotettix Carbonell, 1995Cauratettix Roberts, 1937Euplectrotettix Bruner, 1900Jagomphocerus Carbonell, 1995Meloscirtus Bruner, 1906Parapellopedon Jago, 1971Pellopedon Bruner, 1911Rhammatocerus Saussure, 1861Scyllinula Carbonell, 1995Stereotettix Rehn, 1906
Stenobothrini
Auth.: Harz, 1975 - PalaearticMegaulacobothrus Caudell, 1921Omocestus Bolívar, 1878Stenobothrus'' Fischer, 1853

Tribe not determined

References

 
Orthoptera subfamilies
Taxa named by Franz Xaver Fieber